Bastaji is a small village in the municipality of Nikšić, Montenegro.

Demographics
According to the 2011 census, the village has a population of 172 people.

References

Populated places in Nikšić Municipality